Harry Sawyer (11 August 1895 - 21 September 1963) was an Australian rules footballer who played with Essendon in the Victorian Football League (VFL).

Notes

External links 
		

1890s births
1981 deaths
Australian rules footballers from Victoria (Australia)
Essendon Football Club players